The Campeonato de Futsal de Paraguay is the futsal tournament played between clubs in Paraguay since 1987 and is run by the Asociación Paraguaya de Fútbol. In 2004, a Second Division Futsal Tournament (the División Intermedia) was installed in order to increase the number of Futsal clubs un Paraguay. The leagues disputed are the Primera División de Fútsal, the División Intermedia de Fútsal and the Primera B de Fútsal.

Winners

Old System
Consisting of only one tournament to declare the champion
 1988 Rubio Ñu
 1989 Halcones de Fernando de la Mora
 1990 Halcones de Fernando de la Mora
 1991 Ex Alumnos San José
 1992 Ex Alumnos CNC
 1993 Ex Alumnos CNC
 1994 Ex Alumnos CNC

New System
Consisting of two tournaments (Apertura and Clausura) with national championship game being disputed  between winner of Apertura and Clausura tournament. Also the "De Campeones" (Of Champions) Cup introduced in 1997.
1995 6 de Agosto
Apertura: 6 de Agosto
Clausura: Santa Rosa
1996 Recoleta
Apertura: Recoleta
Clausura: Recoleta
1997 Recoleta
Apertura: Recoleta
Clausura: Recoleta
De Campeones: Ex Alumnos CNC
1998 Ex Alumnos CNC
Apertura: Ex Alumnos CNC
Clausura: Ex Alumnos CNC
De Campeones: 6 de Agosto
1999 Ex Alumnos CNC
Apertura: Ex Alumnos CNC
Clausura: Ex Alumnos CNC
De Campeones: 6 de Agosto
2000 Recoleta
Apertura: Recoleta
Clausura: Recoleta
De Campeones: Recoleta
2001 UAA
Apertura: UAA
Clausura: UAA
De Campeones: 6 de Agosto
2002 Coronel Escurra
Apertura: Coronel Escurra
Clausura: Coronel Escurra
De Campeones: UAA
2003 Recoleta
Apertura: UAA
Clausura: Recoleta
2004 UAA
Apertura: suspendido
Clausura: UAA
Liga Nacional: Cerro Porteño
2005 Recoleta
Apertura: Recoleta
Clausura: Sport Colonial
2006 UAA
Apertura: UAA
Clausura: Pablo Rojas
2007 Pablo Rojas
Apertura: Humaitá
Clausura: Pablo Rojas
2008 Pablo Rojas
Apertura: UAA
Clausura: Pablo Rojas

Titles by team

Absolute Championships
 CD Recoleta: 5 titles
 Ex Alumnos CNC: 5 titles
 Universidad Autónoma de Asunción (UAA): 3 titles
 Pablo Rojas: 2 titles
 Halcones de Fernando de la Mora: 2 titles
 6 de Agosto: 1 title
 Coronel Escurra: 1 title
 Rubio Ñu: 1 title
 Ex Alumnos San Jose: 1 title

De Campeones Cup
 6 de Agosto: 3 titles
 Ex Alumnos CNC: 1 title
 CD Recoleta: 1 title
 Universidad Autónoma de Asunción (UAA): 1 title

External links
 Paraguay futsal champions

Futsal competitions in Paraguay
Futsal
Paraguay
Sports leagues established in 1987